The Nationalist Republican Center (CNR) was a Catalan nationalist and liberal-republican political party in Catalonia, Spain.

History and ideology
The main figures of the party were Ildefons Sunyol, Jaume Carner, Joaquim Lluhí, Santiago Gubern and Eduard Calvet. The party represented the liberal line of catalanism. The main objectives of the CNR were the autonomy of Catalonia, universal suffrage and the establishment of a new Spanish republic.

The party published the daily newspaper El Poble Català. In the 1907 general elections CNR participated in Catalan Solidarity. In 1910 the party joined Republican Nationalist Federal Union.

References

 Various authors: Els orígens del republicanisme nacionalista. El Centre Nacionalista Republicà a Catalunya (1906 -1910). Centre d'Història Contemporània de Catalunya, Barcelona, 2009. 

Political parties in Catalonia
Catalan nationalist parties
Republican parties in Spain
Defunct political parties in Spain
Defunct liberal political parties
Political parties established in 1906
Political parties disestablished in 1910
1906 establishments in Spain
1910 disestablishments in Spain
Restoration (Spain)